Pterotopteryx tshatkalica is a moth of the family Alucitidae. It was described by Zagulajev in 1995. It is found in Uzbekistan.

References

Moths described in 1995
Alucitidae